Santa Fe Trails is the local transit agency in Santa Fe, New Mexico. Santa Fe Trails operates ten bus routes which serve most areas of the city. Nearly all of the routes originate at either the Downtown Transit Center one block west of the Plaza, or the Santa Fe Place Transit Center.

The fleet consists of 2001 model Blue Bird CSRE buses (being replaced), 2008 and 2009 model ElDorado EZ Rider II MAX buses, and 2009 model ElDorado Passport buses.  In late 2011, Santa Fe Trails announced an order for two Gillig Low Floor buses, which entered service in 2012. Five additional Gillig Low Floor buses, which are 35 feet long, entered service in 2014. All buses are powered by compressed natural gas.  Santa Fe Trails has operated one of the first bus fleets to be entirely powered by CNG, and continues to be today.

In early 2013, Santa Fe Trails placed an order for five 35-foot Gillig Low Floor buses, which entered service in November 2014; these are the first 35-foot buses for Santa Fe Trails. An additional seven 35-foot Gillig Low Floor buses were ordered in 2014 and are scheduled for delivery in 2015.

Routes and schedules
 1 Agua Fria Route Map Weekday Saturday Sunday
 2 Cerrillos Rd Route Map Weekday Saturday Sunday
 4 Southside Route Map Weekday Saturday Sunday
 5 West Alameda/St. Michael's Route Map Weekday Saturday
 6 Rodeo Rd Route Map Weekday Saturday
 21 Community College Route Map Weekday
 22 HSD/Rancho Viejo Route Map Weekday
 24 Country Club Route Map Weekday Saturday Sunday
 26 Santa Fe Place, South Cerrillos, and Fashion Outlets Route Map Weekday Saturday Sunday
 M Museum Hill Route Map Weekday Saturday Sunday

Fares

Fleet

On order

References

External links
 Santa Fe Trails

Bus transportation in New Mexico
Santa Fe, New Mexico
Transit authorities with natural gas buses
Transportation in Santa Fe County, New Mexico